The 2019–20 European windstorm season was the fifth instance of seasonal European windstorm naming in Europe. This is the first season in which the Netherlands participates, joining Ireland's and the United Kingdom's meteorological agencies. The new season's storm names were released on 6 September 2019. In July 2019, it was announced that storm seasons would run from 1 September 2019 to 1 September 2020. The Portuguese, Spanish and French meteorological agencies again collaborated too, joined by the Belgian meteorological agency.

Background and naming 

In 2015, the Met Office and Met Éireann announced a pilot project to name storm warnings as part of the "Name our Storms" project for wind storms and asked the public for suggestions. The meteorological offices produced a full list of names for 2015–16 through to 2017–18, common to both the United Kingdom and Ireland, with the Netherlands taking part from 2019 onwards. Names in the United Kingdom will be based on the National Severe Weather Warning Service, when a storm is assessed to have the potential for an Amber ('be prepared') or Red ('take action (danger to life)') warning.

There are two main naming lists: one created by the national meteorological agencies of the United Kingdom, Ireland and the Netherlands, and another created by the equivalent agencies from France, Spain, Portugal and Belgium. Additionally, former Atlantic hurricanes will retain their names as assigned by the National Hurricane Center of the United States.

United Kingdom, Ireland and the Netherlands 
The following names have been selected for the 2019–2020 season:

'Liam' was chosen through a poll made by Met Éireann on Twitter.

France, Spain, Portugal and Belgium 
This will be the third year in which the meteorological agencies of France, Spain and Portugal will be naming storms which affect their areas. This naming scheme is partially overlapping with that used by the United Kingdom, Ireland and the Netherlands, as storms named by the other group of agencies will be used reciprocally.

The following names have been selected for the 2019–2020 season:

Other naming systems 
Two former Atlantic systems (One of them being a hurricane and the other being a tropical storm) transitioned into a European windstorm and retained its name as assigned by the National Hurricane Center in Miami, Florida:

Besides these naming systems, the Free University of Berlin also names high and low pressure areas through its "Adopt a vortex" programme. The Nordic nations of Denmark, Norway and Sweden also name storms with more limited reciprocation. Other nations may also name storms either through their national meteorological institutions or popularly.

Season summary 

The first system of the season was Storm Lorenzo, when Met Éireann issued yellow wind warnings for Ireland and an orange warning for the western coastal counties. The storm consisted of the remnants of Hurricane Lorenzo, which had turned extratropical. The next named system was Amélie, named by Météo-France on 1 November. Storm Bernardo was named next, by the Spanish meteorological agency, AEMET. This system primarily affected the Balearic Islands. Cecilia was named next by AEMET, when the agency warned of rain and wind on the Iberian Peninsula and the Balearic Islands.

On 6 December, the Irish meteorological agency named Atiyah, the first system to receive its name from the Irish, British and Dutch storm naming list. After Atiyah passed, storms Daniel, Elsa and Fabien were named in quick succession on 15, 16 and 18 December, respectively. Storms Brendan and Gloria were next to be named by Met Éireann and AEMET, respectively, after a quiet start to January 2020. A few days later, on 5 February, Ciara was named by Met Office, warning of heavy rain and gales throughout the United Kingdom.

Following Ciara, Dennis was named by the Met Office on 11 February 2020. The agency warned of heavy rain and gales across the United Kingdom. A day later, Inès was named by the French meteorological agency. Following Jorge, Karine, Leon, Myriam and Norberto were named in quick succession, on 29 February, 1, 3 and 5 March, respectively. Karine was named by AEMET, while Leon, Myriam and Norberto were named by Météo-France.

Storms

Storm Lorenzo 

The National Hurricane Center in Miami, Florida began monitoring a tropical wave emerging from the west coast of Africa on 19 September, which subsequently developed into Hurricane Lorenzo by 25 September. The system continued to intensify, ultimately becoming the easternmost Category 5 hurricane on record in the Atlantic Ocean. On 26 September, the Instituto Português do Mar e da Atmosfera (IPMA) began issuing advisories for Hurricane Lorenzo. The National Hurricane Center issued hurricane and tropical storm watches on 30 September for the Azores, which were later upgraded to warnings.

Lorenzo began undergoing extratropical transition on 2 October, while passing over the Azores a few hours before the National Hurricane Center issued their 09:00 UTC advisory. The subsequent (and final) advisory stated that Lorenzo had become a post-tropical cyclone, which was subsequently named Storm Lorenzo by Met Éireann as they issued a yellow warning of wind for the entirety of Ireland, as well as an orange warning for the western coastal counties. The Met Office issued yellow wind warnings for Northern Ireland, Cornwall and parts of Devon and south-west Wales.

On 4 October, while the storm was passing across Ireland, new weather warnings were issued for the counties of Clare, Galway, Longford, Mayo, Roscommon and Westmeath.

Storm Lorenzo continued to weaken as it moved away from Ireland into the Irish Sea, with the United States-based Ocean Prediction Center ceasing to monitor Lorenzo on 4 October after it crossed the United Kingdom. Now little more than a weak frontal zone, Storm Lorenzo made landfall in northern Germany on 5 October, subsequently moving over eastern Europe the following day before dissipating on 7 October while moving into Russia.

Power was cut to almost 20,000 homes in Ireland at the height of the storm, with flooding occurring throughout the country. The amount of damage country-wide, however, was less than anticipated. The storm's only known fatality while it was extratropical occurred when a tree fell on a person in Stafford. However, Lorenzo had been responsible for nineteen further fatalities, including seven crew members of the capsized French cargo ship Bourbon Rhode who were never found. During its combined lifespan as a major hurricane and a European windstorm, Lorenzo caused at least £285 million (€340 million) in damage.

Storm Amélie (Arne) 

The low-pressure system that would later become Amélie was first noted on 31 October between Canada and Greenland over the Labrador Sea. After emerging into the open Atlantic, the system was named Storm Amélie by Météo-France on 1 November. The French meteorological agency expected wind gusts up to and possibly surpassing  locally at the western coast at the time of naming the storm.

Amélie also brought wind gusts up to  along the northern coast of Spain, including a record-setting  gust for Santander Airport. The highest wind gust recorded from Amélie was at Cagnano in Haute-Corse on Corsica, reaching .

Besides causing numerous fallen trees and power outages for 140,000 properties, Amélie also triggered a landslide in Nice in the south of France, resulting in the only known fatality from the storm. The SNCF temporarily closed a TGV line between Hendaye and Bordeaux due to debris on the tracks, causing some 2,000 passengers to be stranded for up to 15 hours. Damage from Amélie across France, Italy and Spain totalled more than £110 million (€120 million).

After the centre of Amélie moved inland over northern France, it gradually tracked eastwards and then north-eastwards. Amélie passed over Belgium and the Netherlands on 3 November and then over Germany on 4 November, while steadily weakening. After crossing Poland on 5 November as a weak frontal boundary, Amélie stalled over the Baltic states on 6 November, before being absorbed by an approaching warm front over Estonia on 9 November.

Storm Bernardo (Detlef)

The precursor to Storm Bernardo was first noted as a deep low over north-eastern Canada on 7 November. After considerably weakening and crossing the Atlantic without any notable impacts, the system was named Bernardo by the State Meteorological Agency of Spain (AEMET) on 9 November as it was approaching the Iberian Peninsula from the Bay of Biscay. Bernardo crossed northern Spain and emerged into the Mediterranean Sea, affecting the Balearic Islands on 10 November with wind gusts of up to  recorded in the Alfabia Mountains along the north-west coast of Mallorca. However, AEMET did not confirm that the storm had reached medicane status.

After losing its brief eye-like feature, Bernardo followed the coast of Algeria, remaining closely offshore as it moved eastwards across the Mediterranean before stalling over southern Italy for two days. Bernardo then accelerated to the north-east as a weak frontal boundary, moving over the Baltic states on 14 November and into northern Russia on 15 November. After briefly reintensifying and then weakening once more, Bernardo was last noted as a weak low over Siberia on 18 November.

When first issuing warnings for Storm Bernardo, AEMET expected wave heights of up to  around the Balearic Islands and along the coast of several Spanish provinces bordering the Bay of Biscay. In Asturias, the regional meteorological agency warned of the risk of avalanches due to snow accumulation. However, impacts from Bernardo were ultimately minimal. A fallen tree in Mallorca caused the only known fatality from the storm, and little damage was reported along its track.

Storm Cecilia (Luis)

The precursor to Storm Cecila was first noted as a developing low between the Carolinas and Bermuda on 16 November. It subsequently deepened and slowly moved north-eastwards parallel to the East Coast of the United States, before crossing Newfoundland and emerging into the open Atlantic by 21 November. At this point, the system was named Cecilia by the State Meteorological Agency of Spain (AEMET), who issued warnings for rain and wind impacts across the Iberian Peninsula and on the Balearic Islands. Weather warnings were also issued in southern and coastal western France.

During the storm, a chemical transport ship ran aground at the Galician coast. However, overall impacts were minimal across Spain.

Cecilia weakened as it crossed the Iberian Peninsula and emerged into the Mediterranean Sea, crossing Italy as a weak frontal system on 25 November. Continuing slowly eastwards, Cecilia was last noted over the Black Sea on 28 November before being absorbed by Storm Sebastien over southern Ukraine on 29 November.

Storm Sebastien 

A large area of disturbed weather persisted over the central subtropical Atlantic in mid-November. On 19 November, this area of thunderstorm activity developed sufficiently to be designated Tropical Storm Sebastien by the National Hurricane Center in Miami, Florida. After several days of slow movement, Sebastien accelerated towards the north-east and began slowly losing tropical characteristics. The system completed its extratropical transition late on 24 November, becoming extratropical Storm Sebastien in the process.

After becoming extratropical, Storm Sebastien began to re-intensify as it was now situated in a favourable baroclinic environment. Sebastien maintained this intensity for around two days as it crossed Ireland and the United Kingdom and entered the North Sea, before slowly weakening as it made landfall in Denmark on 29 November. Around this time, Sebastien absorbed the remnants of Storm Cecilia to its south-east. Sebastien continued to weaken as it accelerated north-eastwards into European Russia, finally being absorbed by a larger low-pressure system to its north by 1 December.

Heavy rainfall was the primary threat from Storm Sebastien. As the storm approached the United Kingdom, the Met Office issued yellow weather warnings for heavy rainfall in Northern England, South West England and South Wales. Many of these areas had already been impacted by ongoing flooding, and the Environment Agency issued seven "danger to life" flood warnings in Yorkshire and 60 flood alerts across England and Wales as a result.

However, impacts from Storm Sebastien were ultimately less severe than anticipated. Heavy rainfall and thunderstorms caused disruption in the London area. Flooding and wind damage was reported on the Isle of Wight. Minor coastal flooding was also reported in the Fareham area, although far less severe than had been forecasted.

Storm Atiyah (Rudi)

A low was first noted to be developing off the coast of New England by the Ocean Prediction Center on 5 December. The following day, as the low continued to develop and move eastwards across the far north Atlantic, Met Éireann named the system Atiyah and issued orange wind warnings for the western counties of Ireland and yellow warnings for the remainder of the country. On 8 December, a red weather warning was issued for County Kerry due to the increasing risk of high wind impacts.

High winds were recorded across the United Kingdom and Ireland, cutting power to 34,000 homes, downing trees and causing disruption throughout both countries.

After widespread impacts across western Europe, Atiyah continued to move away from the region, making landfall in northern Norway on 10 December. Atiyah weakened rapidly as it continued eastwards, and it was last noted as a weak frontal system over Siberia on 13 December. Throughout its lifespan, Atiyah caused at least £40 million (€44 million) in damage.

Storm Daniel (Xander)

Storm Daniel developed as a weak disturbance along a cold front a short distance offshore of Portugal on 15 December, and it was officially named by the State Meteorological Agency of Spain (AEMET) later that day.

After making landfall in Portugal, Storm Daniel moved north-eastwards across the Iberian Peninsula into the Bay of Biscay, making a second landfall in southern Brittany, France as a weak trough on 17 December. Daniel subsequently began to weaken and unravel as a coherent system, dissipating over western Russia by 21 December.

During the passage of Storm Daniel, the use of snow chains on car tyres became necessary to navigate sections of the N-630 road in central Spain, while the Puerto de Pajares mountain pass was closed to trucks, articulated vehicles and buses due to blizzard conditions. The strongest wind gust from Storm Daniel was measured at La Pinilla ski resort in Segovia, Spain, reaching .  of rain fell at Riaño, León during the passage of the storm. Overall, however, damage and disruption from Storm Daniel was minimal.

Storm Elsa (Yadid)

Storm Elsa originated as an area of low pressure which formed over the Gulf of Mexico on 13 December and subsequently tracked gradually north-eastward, bottoming out at  along the coast of Canada on 16 December. At this time, the Instituto Português do Mar e da Atmosfera (IPMA) named the low Elsa. 
After being named, Elsa moved away from Canada into the open Atlantic and stalled for four days to the west of the British Isles, fluctuating in intensity. On 21 December, Elsa finally began accelerating to the east ahead of Storm Fabien, which was approaching Elsa from the west. Elsa passed north of Scotland and made landfall in Norway before being absorbed by an unnamed secondary low, approaching from the south, by 22 December.

As Storm Elsa slowly approached, Met Éireann issued a nationwide yellow weather warning for Ireland, followed on 18 December by an upgrade to an orange warning for County Cork. The yellow warnings for counties Galway and Mayo were further upgraded to orange warnings at 20:00 local time that day, around an hour before the storm made its closest and most intense approach to Ireland. Severe flooding and extreme gusts were reported along the County Galway coastline. Close to 22:00, a storm surge breached the Promenade on Salthill in Galway City; over 50 cars were lost to the floodwaters. Besides the flooding, a ship ran aground after being forced onto coastal rocks by rough seas. Severe flooding was also reported in the Spanish Arch, Port of Galway, Oranmore and Kinvara areas of Galway. Fallen trees were reported across the city and county, blocking numerous roads leading to Galway City. Around 22:30, Galway City Council activated its Emergency Response Plan and issued a notice warning people to stay indoors and to remain there unless it was of extreme importance. A similar warning was issued by Galway County Council. Members of the Gardaí, National Ambulance Service, Galway Fire Service and Civil Defence Ireland were deployed to Salthill and conducted searches on cars trapped in floodwaters.

Severe weather associated with Storm Elsa resulted in eight fatalities, primarily in southern Europe. More than 140,000 properties lost electricity during the passage of the storm, and damage totals ultimately reached at least £74 million (€81 million). In the aftermath of Storm Elsa, Met Éireann's short notice of upgrading weather warnings around one hour before the storm hit the counties of Mayo and Galway was criticized. The agency defended their warnings, citing that "the nature of forecasting is that it is never certain [...]" and that they issue warnings when they see fit.

Storm Fabien (Ailton)

The system that would go on to become Storm Fabien formed as the easternmost of a series of weak lows which developed as disturbances along a stationary front situated across the southern United States on 17 December. The low broke free from this front and drifted northeastwards along the east coast of the United States, emerging into the Atlantic Ocean east of Newfoundland on 19 December. Météo-France issued orange warnings for fifteen departments in the south-west of France.

Storm Fabien rapidly intensified as it crossed the Atlantic, its progress slightly slowed down by the presence of Storm Elsa which had already been situated almost stationary over the north Atlantic for several days prior to Fabien's formation. After initially pushing Elsa along ahead of itself, Fabien subsequently accelerated to the south of Elsa and reached its peak intensity of  while approaching landfall in South West England on 21 December. After crossing southern England, Fabien began to slow down and weaken, crossing over central Europe on 23 December before stalling for several days while centred over Cyprus as a weak trough along a stationary front from 24 December. After slowly drifting back northwards, Fabien made landfall on Ukraine's Black Sea coastline on 28 December, and dissipated shortly thereafter.

Despite the centre of Storm Fabien making landfall in southern England, the previous interaction with Storm Elsa to Fabien's north meant that the strongest winds were confined to the southern side of the storm, in particular across France. The SNCF canceled services in southwestern France as a result of high winds blowing trees onto railway tracks and around 100,000 households were left without power in the same region. All of the island's airports were closed and the ferry service between the island and the mainland was suspended as well. In Galicia, Spain, around 80,000 homes were left without power following the passage of Storm Fabien. A train crashed into a fallen tree on the railway line between Vigo and Barcelona; no fatalities were reported. Along its path, damage from Storm Fabien totalled £95 million (€100 million).

Storm Brendan (Fenja)

Storm Brendan first developed as a weak low along a frontal boundary over northern Texas on 10 January. This low moved slowly northeastwards across the United States without much development, crossing over Atlantic Canada and emerging into the Atlantic Ocean on 12 January. The low began to undergo explosive intensification as soon as it entered the Atlantic, and on 13 January Met Éireann named the low Brendan. Brendan subsequently stalled southeast of Iceland and began to slowly weaken as secondary lows accelerated around its large southern periphery. On 17 January, the much weakened centre of Storm Brendan's primary circulation made landfall in northern Norway, subsequently accelerating eastwards; it was last noted as a weakening frontal system over northeastern Russia on 19 January.

Storm Brendan made its closest approach to Ireland and the United Kingdom while at peak intensity late on 13 January, with the centre of the storm remaining just offshore to the north of Scotland. However, Brendan's large size resulted in impacts across the British Isles. Power outages were reported across Ireland, with more than 100,000 properties without electricity at the height of the storm. Transport was severely disrupted, with ferry cancellations across Scotland. All schools in the Outer Hebrides were closed as a result of dangerously high winds. Preliminary damage totals as a result of Storm Brendan ran into the millions of dollars, and one person was killed.

Storm Gloria (Ilka)

The system that would eventually become Storm Gloria was first noted as a developing complex of low-pressure systems over the central United States on 9 January. A large trough associated with the low dug into the Southwestern United States from 10 January, providing a path for cold air that had been settled over Canada to move southwards and clash with warm, moist air moving northward from the Gulf of Mexico. This provided conditions for the low to develop and intensify as it moved eastwards across the United States before exiting into the north Atlantic on 13 January.

After stalling off the coast of North America for several days, the system began moving steadily eastwards across the open Atlantic on 17 January, reaching a peak intensity of  around that time.  The State Meteorological Agency of Spain (AEMET) named the low Gloria on 18 January, issuing the first severe weather warnings as the storm was approaching the Iberian Peninsula. After turning southeastwards and entering the Bay of Biscay, Gloria subsequently made landfall close to Santander in northern Spain on 19 January.

Gloria quickly passed over northern Spain as a weak cyclone and then emerged into the western Mediterranean Sea, where it stalled for several days. After remaining nearly stationary near the Balearic Islands for around 48 hours, Gloria began to slowly drift southwards and then westwards, passing over the Strait of Gibraltar and northern Morocco on 22 January before emerging into the far eastern Atlantic on 23 January. After looping for several days offshore to the south and west of Portugal, Gloria dissipated on 25 January off the country's southern coast.

High winds and heavy rainfall caused severe damage along the path of Gloria. Gloria's exceptionally slow movement resulted in severe flash flooding across northeastern Spain and southern France. In total, across France, Portugal and Spain, seventeen people were killed as a result of Storm Gloria, including three people whose bodies were never found. Preliminary damage totals relating to Gloria are at least £150 million (€180 million).

Storm Hervé (Petra)

Storm Hervé originated as a weak shortwave disturbance along a frontal boundary over the Azores on 2 February. Slowly developing as it drifted northeastwards along the frontal boundary, Météo-France named the weak low Hervé during the afternoon of 3 February. After entering the English Channel, Hervé moved generally eastward offshore between the United Kingdom and France, expanding in size before making landfall in Belgium on 4 February.

Hervé began to slow down and gradually weaken on 6 February as it emerged over the Black Sea; this weakening trend accelerated on 7 February, when Hervé degenerated back into a shortwave trough following landfall in far southern Russia. Hervé was last noted moving into eastern Turkey on 8 February, dissipating by the next day.

The most considerable impacts from Storm Hervé were felt in Central Europe. Strong wind gusts and flooding led to two deaths in Austria, and another person died in the Czech Republic as a result of Hervé. Overnight on 3–4 February, as Hervé was approaching from the west, it brought the highest winds recorded in Switzerland since 1981, also severely impacting southern Germany and Austria around the same time.

Storm Ciara (Sabine) 

On 4 February 2020, the Met Office issued a yellow weather warning for wind covering all of the United Kingdom across the following weekend due to high confidence in the model forecasts for a potential high-impact storm, although the system involved had not yet formed and no name was issued for it at that time. The next day, Storm Ciara was formally named by the Met Office; in Germany the storm is called Sabine. It formed out of a weak area of low pressure emerging into the Atlantic Ocean from the southeastern United States earlier that day; the precursor system had previously brought heavy snowfall to large tracts of the United States and Eastern Canada, with tornadoes across the southern and mid-Atlantic states.

Additional orange wind warnings were issued for the counties Galway, Mayo and Donegal on 7 February.

The same date, the Met Office issued an amber warning for southeast England for Sunday. The rest of the United Kingdom remained under a yellow wind warning. The Royal Dutch Football Association (KNVB) also postponed all premier league matches set for 9 February.

On 9 February, the storm set above Belgium; due to the strong winds, the Royal Belgian Football Association (KBVB) postponed all football events on this day and also the Vlaamse Aardbeiencross was cancelled.

Ciara caused an estimated €500 million in damage in Germany.

Storm Inès (Tomris)

Inès was named by the French meteorological agency, Météo-France, on 12 February 2020.

Inès formed above Newfoundland on 11 February.

Storm Dennis (Victoria)

Storm Dennis was named jointly by the UK Met Office, Met Éireann and the Netherlands Meteorological Service on 11 February, with heavy rain and strong winds expected to affect the UK from 15 February. It was quickly nicknamed "Dennis the Menace," as a reference from The Beano character of the same name.

Storm Jorge (Charlotte)

Jorge was named by the Spanish meteorological agency on 27 February. Met Eireann issued Status Red wind warnings for County Galway and County Clare and Status Orange wind warnings for the remainder of the country, while in the United Kingdom the Met Office issued yellow wind warnings for all of Wales and Northern Ireland, most of England and parts of Scotland before it even hit Iceland.

Storm Karine (Diana III)

Storm Karine was named by AEMET on 29 February to impact on 2 March. The storm was named before Leon, however Leon developed before Karine on 1 March and so alphabetical order does not correspond to chronological order of these two storms.

Storm Leon (Diana II)

Storm Leon was named by MétéoFrance on 1 March to affect the country later the same day.

Storm Myriam

Storm Norberto (Elli)

Storm Ellen 

Storm Ellen was named by the Irish Meteorological Office on 18 August 2020.

On 18 August, Met Éireann issued a Status Orange wind warning for counties Galway, Mayo, Clare, Cork, Kerry, Limerick and Waterford for Wednesday, 19 August through Thursday, 20 August, expecting gusts of between 110 km/h and 130 km/h. On 19 August, a Status Red wind warning for Cork was issued valid from Wednesday 19 August until midnight. On 20 August, Ellen absorbed the remnants of Tropical Storm Kyle.

On 20 August, Met Éireann issued a Status Yellow wind warning for counties Dublin, Louth, Wexford, Wicklow, Meath, Cork, Kerry and Waterford, expecting very strong winds and a continued risk of coastal flooding.

Storm Francis (Kirsten)

Storm Francis was named by the UK Met Office on 24 August. It was forecast to make landfall off the West Coast of Ireland on 25 August, with very severe winds, rain and impacts for most of the country, as well as the west of the UK. 2 yellow weather warnings for Wind & Rain were issued by the Met Office for the storm's impacts on 25 & 26 August.

In Wales, Storm Francis was the cause of a large amount of flash flooding in the South of the country, as an indirect cause of this many homes were left without power.

Met Éireann issued Status Orange - Rainfall warning for Connacht, Cavan, Monaghan, Donegal, Wexford, Cork, Kerry and Waterford. This warning was issued on 24 August 2020 11:00 and valid between 24 August 2020 21:00 and 25 August 2020 17:00. Status Yellow - Rainfall warning was put in place for all remaining counties, including Northern Ireland's counties. Eastern counties received Status Yellow - Wind warning as well.

The KMI from Belgium issued an orange warning for summerstorm Francis.

In The Netherlands the KNMI issued a yellow warning.

Storm Odette (Wicca)

Other systems 
On 29 September, a moderate storm named Mortimer by FUB moved across central Europe and killed three people.

In late October 2019, a medicane formed far east in the Mediterranean Sea. It affected Cyprus, Israel and Egypt. The storm formed in the far east of the sea, something which is not seen often.

On 10–11 December, an explosively deepening storm affected Iceland, where the meteorological office declared its first red warning for parts of the country. The system was named Siro by the Free University of Berlin. The storm was described by Icelandic meteorologists as a once in a decade event.

On 15 January the extreme weather event Didrik hit the southern coast of Norway with high coastal waters. This weather event was caused by Storm Brendan, which for a longer period had stalled south east of Iceland, and a secondary low named Gerlinde by the Free University of Berlin. Storm Brendan had for a longer period pushed water towards the coast of Norway bringing high coastal waters already from 13 January. Gerlinde was expected to bring even higher water levels. Due to these two low pressure areas, combined with full moon 10 January, the Norwegian Meteorological Institute named the event Didrik. Gerlinde moved quicker than expected over southern Norway and brought lower water levels to the southern coast, but Brendan however moved towards the coast more powerful than expected and brought higher water levels on the western coast. The weather event made damage to many buildings along the coast as well as disrupt railway services due to flooding.

On 28 January, Storm Lolita, named by FUB, caused two deaths in Germany.

On 14 February, a rapidly deepening low in the Atlantic affected Iceland, named Uta by the Free University of Berlin. Red wind warnings for the south of Iceland were issued with reports of coastal flooding around the Reykjanes peninsula.

On 22 February storm Tuuli, named by the Finnish Meteorological Institute, hit Finland.

On 27 February Bianca (FUB) affected France, Switzerland and Germany.

On 12 March storm Laura hit Denmark and southern Sweden. It was named Laura by the Danish Meteorological Institute, and known as Hanna by the Free University of Berlin. Strong winds cut the power to more than 20,000 people, and also closed the Öresund bridge.

On 25 July a storm hit the eastern parts of Finland. Despite its severity it was only unofficially named Uuno by the Finnish media. Strong winds caused trees to fall over electrical lines cutting power to more than 3,000 people. The damages to forests was estimated to cost between 2 and 3 million euros.

On 30 July another storm hit Finland. This was more powerful and was officially named Päivö by the Finnish Meteorological Institute.

Season effects

Coordination of storms named by European meteorological services

Notes

References

External links 

 Agencia Estatal de Meteorología storm list 
 Instituto Português do Mar e da Atmosfera 
 Koninklijk Meteorologisch Instituut 
 Koninklijk Nederlands Meteorologisch Instituut 
 Met Éireann
 Met Office UK Storm Centre
 Météo-France 

2019 meteorology
2020 meteorology
2019 natural disasters
2020 natural disasters
2019-2020